Klaus-Dieter Jank (born 23 November 1952) is a German former professional footballer who played as a striker.

References

External links
 
 

1952 births
Living people
Association football forwards
German footballers
German expatriate footballers
Expatriate footballers in France
VfB Stuttgart players
SV Werder Bremen players
Stuttgarter Kickers players
Stade Lavallois players
Bundesliga players
2. Bundesliga players
Ligue 1 players
People from Waiblingen
Sportspeople from Stuttgart (region)
Footballers from Baden-Württemberg